Stefania Stanzani (born 24 March 1968) is an Italian basketball player. She competed in the women's tournament at the 1992 Summer Olympics.

References

1968 births
Living people
Italian women's basketball players
Olympic basketball players of Italy
Basketball players at the 1992 Summer Olympics
Basketball players from Rome